Sweet Hostage is a 1975 American made-for-television drama film based on the novel Welcome to Xanadu by Nathaniel Benchley. The film stars Linda Blair and Martin Sheen. It was filmed in Taos County, New Mexico. It was featured in ABC's Friday Night Movie series.
Film and television critic Leonard Maltin rated the movie as "Average" in his biennial ratings guide TV Movies. In his capsule review, Maltin said "the performances by Sheen and Blair almost made this talky adaptation of the Nathaniel Benchley novel worthwhile".
The film was only a moderate success in the Nielsen ratings, and failed to generate the type of provocative press which was then-standard for a Linda Blair movie.

Synopsis
In this made-for-television drama, a 31-year-old fugitive mental patient who quotes poetry kidnaps an illiterate, underage girl from a nearby farm and forces her to go to a lonely mountain cabin. There he teaches her to read and, ultimately, she succumbs to Stockholm Syndrome. He eventually kills himself during a shootout raid to save the girl, who reunite with her parents.

Cast
 Linda Blair as Doris Mae Withers
 Martin Sheen as Leonard Hatch
 Jeanne Cooper as Mrs. Withers
 Lee de Broux as Sheriff Emmet
 Bert Remsen as Mr. Withers
 Dehl Berti as Harry Fox
 Al Hopson as Mr. Smathers
 William Sterchi as Hank Smathers
 Roberto Valentino De Leon as Juan
 Michael Eiland as Tom Martinez
 Mary Michael Carnes as dry goods clerk
 Don Hann as liquor store proprietor
 Ross Elder as hospital attendant
 Chris Williams as man in bungalow

DVD
Sweet Hostage was released to DVD by Warner Home Video on November 2, 2011, as a Region 1 MOD DVD made available through Warner Archive Collection.

See also
Stockholm syndrome

References

External links

1975 television films
1975 films
1975 romantic drama films
American romantic drama films
American television films
Films about kidnapping
Films based on works by Nathaniel Benchley
Films based on American novels
Films directed by Lee Philips
Films shot in New Mexico
1970s American films